Dawn Sherrese Robinson (born November 24, 1966 or 1968) is an American singer and actress best known as a founding member of the R&B/pop group En Vogue, one of the world's best-selling girl groups of all time. Following her departure from En Vogue, Robinson joined Lucy Pearl and released their self-titled debut album Lucy Pearl in 2000, which went platinum worldwide and produced the successful singles "Dance Tonight" and "Don't Mess with My Man".

In 2002, Robinson released her first solo album Dawn, which produced the single "Envious". In 2005, Robinson rejoined En Vogue for a tour, but departed from the group before they could record another album. In 2009, Robinson briefly returned to En Vogue again for their 20th Anniversary Tour. In 2010, she left En Vogue once again due to poor management and compensation of work. In 2013, she joined the cast of R&B Divas: Los Angeles for the first season of the series. Throughout her career, Robinson has sold a combined total of over 11 million records as a member of En Vogue, Lucy Pearl and a solo artist. Her work with En Vogue has earned her several awards and nominations, including two American Music Awards, a Billboard Music Award, seven MTV Video Music Awards, four Soul Train Music Awards and eight Grammy nominations.

Early life and education 
Born in New London, Connecticut, Robinson was the oldest of three children born to John W. Robinson (1943–2014) and Barbara Alexander. During her childhood, Robinson sang in the choir at AME Zion Church in Connecticut. Shortly thereafter, Robinson began recording music in the studio, traveling from New London to Massachusetts. During a Stephanie Mills concert, Robinson's mother was able to get the band to listen to a tape of Robinson. The band advised Robinson's mother to send her to California. In 1980, Robinson aged 13 relocated to California, where she lived with an older cousin. Robinson's mother and sister later joined her in California, settling in the city of Oakland in 1981. For high school, Robinson first attended Oakland High School and later graduated from San Leandro High School in 1984. She later attended the Institute of Cosmetology in Oakland.

Career

1989–1998: En Vogue 

In July 1989, Robinson auditioned for a female group. Robinson was one of four women selected to become part of the group which became En Vogue. The four began recording their debut album in August 1989 and completed in December of the same year. In 1990, En Vogue released their first single "Hold On", which became a number-one single. Later this year, the group released their debut album Born to Sing, which went platinum. The group released their next multi-platinum album Funky Divas in 1992. Robinson sang lead vocals on the album's top-charting singles which included "My Lovin' (You're Never Gonna Get It)", "Giving Him Something He Can Feel", and "Free Your Mind", which remains one of their signature songs. "Free Your Mind" won two MTV Video Music Awards, for "Best R&B Video" and "Best Dance Video". En Vogue released an EP in the Fall 1993, titled Runaway Love. The extended play featured Robinson's lead vocals on the number-one hit "Whatta Man", which featured Salt-n-Pepa. The song also appeared on Salt-N-Pepa's Very Necessary album.

In 1996, En Vogue recorded "Don't Let Go (Love)" with Robinson singing lead vocals. The song featured on the soundtrack to the motion picture Set It Off. Released in the autumn, it became the group's biggest hit to date going number one worldwide. It also sold millions of copies and became certified platinum by the RIAA. Inadvertently, it would also be the last En Vogue single to feature Robinson. One of Robinson's last performances with the group came in October of that year, when the group sang the last national anthem rendition in the history of Atlanta–Fulton County Stadium in Atlanta, which came in game five of the 1996 World Series. In response to the large commercial success of "Don't Let Go (Love)", the group steadfastly went to work on its third album. As the album was nearing completion, Robinson chose to leave the group in April 1997 after difficult contractual negotiations reached a stalemate. Despite Robinson's abrupt departure, En Vogue resolved to continue as a trio. Later that year, Robinson contributed to The Firm on their hit song "Firm Biz" which sampled Teena Marie's single "Square Biz". In 1998 Robinson recorded "Rock Steady" for the movie "Dr. Dolittle".

1999–2000: Lucy Pearl 

In 1999, Robinson appeared in and recorded the jazz classic "Drop Me Off in Harlem" for the movie Life. Later the same year, Robinson joined Lucy Pearl. The group released their self-titled debut album Lucy Pearl in May 2000 on EMI Records, which sold over a million copies worldwide. The album's lead single "Dance Tonight" charted at number five on the R&B singles chart as well as at number 35 on the Billboard Hot 100. Following the release of their album, Lucy Pearl toured in the United States and internationally making several television appearances on shows that including The Tonight Show with Jay Leno, The Chris Rock Show and Later with Jools Holland. In October 2000, Lucy Pearl released the second single "Don't Mess with My Man", which became the group's most successful single in the UK, peaking at number 20 in the UK Singles Chart. It also garnered success in France where it peaked at number 14. In the United States, the song was just as successful as their debut single "Dance Tonight", peaking at number 35 on the Billboard Hot 100. Shortly after the release of their second single, Robinson left the group due to the lack of fair compensation within the group. After unsuccessfully trying to negotiate a fair agreement with her bandmate Raphael Saadiq, Robinson quit the group and was replaced by Joi. However, Lucy Pearl disbanded in 2001 and did not release a second album.

2001–2006: Dawn and return to En Vogue 
In 2001, Robinson had signed with Dr. Dre's Aftermath Entertainment. After leaving Aftermath Entertainment, Robinson released a solo album titled Dawn, on "Q Records" a division of QVC and Atlantic Records in January 2002. Robinson also went on several national telecasts promoting the single. In 2005, after an eight-year absence, Robinson reunited En Vogue. With Robinson part of En Vogue (completing the original line-up), they went on to sign with one of the industry's largest management firms, The Firm Management Group. In September 2005, they joined Salt N Pepa for the girl groups' first-ever joint public performance of their 1994 hit, "Whatta Man" at VH-1's Hip Hop Honors. They also earned another Grammy nomination for the single "So What the Fuss", which featured Stevie Wonder and Prince (on guitar). The group also appeared in the single's music video. After failing to agree on business terms, Robinson again chose to leave En Vogue and was replaced by Rhona Bennett. As a result, En Vogue was let go from The Firm.

2008–2011: Solo career and final return to En Vogue 
 In April 2008, Robinson started touring and doing private events, performing songs she recorded with En Vogue and Lucy Pearl. Later that year, Robinson reunited with En Vogue and performed at the 2008 BET Awards along with Alicia Keys, SWV, and TLC. In 2009, Robinson joined En Vogue for their "20th Anniversary Tour". In 2010, all four members appeared on the cover of Jet magazine to promote their reunion tour. Following their reunion tour, Robinson decided not to record on the new En Vogue album due in the fall of 2011 after failing to reach an agreement. On September 26, 2011, Ellis, Jones & Herron without Robinson, debuted their new single "I'll Cry Later" from their forthcoming album that was planned for a December release. Negotiations for the album release resulted in Robinson leaving En Vogue which was discussed with Jones on Access Hollywood nearly a year later on October 17, 2012. Robinson and Jones talked about the contract issues and poor management of En Vogue.

2012: Heirs to the Throne 
In October 2012, Dawn and Maxine Jones appeared on Access Hollywood to announce they are forming a new girl group named Heirs to the Throne. The duo launched their website, Twitter, and Facebook for the new group. They also performed at several venues. The following year, Robinson and Jones parted ways and Jones went on to form her own group called "En Vogue to the Max". It was later announced that the former group mates Cindy Herron and Terry Ellis sued Maxine Jones for use of the En Vogue name and demanding $1 million for damages. However, Ellis and Herron could not demonstrate harm done to the company from Jones' use of the name. Robinson participated as a witness in the trial but ultimately stated that she was not directly involved in the dispute as she had surrendered her rights to use the name herself when she departed from the LLC years earlier.

2013–2018: R&B Divas and solo career 
In 2013, Robinson joined the cast of R&B Divas: Los Angeles. The series premiered on TV One on July 10, 2013. The series chronicles the lives of R&B singers Robinson, Lil Mo, Chanté Moore, Kelly Price, Claudette Ortiz, and Michel'le as they balance their music careers and personal lives. It is a spinoff to R&B Divas: Atlanta. Throughout the series, Robinson introduced us to her celebrity boyfriend Christopher Nils Connolly. The reunion, which Robinson did not participate in, was filmed on August 6, 2013, with Wendy Williams as the host. Robinson turned down her option and will not be appearing in the second season of the show. Bravo have apparently shown interest in Robinson and Connolly doing their own reality show. Robinson was to begin touring with selected cast members from both R&B Divas LA and Atlanta within the United States. In November 2014, on TMZ Live, Robinson threatened to sue Lifetime if it did not change its marketing which falsely claimed the four original members were involved in An En Vogue Christmas, a movie only consisting of two original En Vogue members (Cindy Herron and Terry Ellis) and Rhona Bennett. In 2017, Robinson told Hollywood correspondent Noreen Lanie she is working on a new album; however, a release date has not been confirmed.

2019–present: The Funky Divas 
In October 2019, Robinson reunited with En Vogue for an on-stage performance to salute music industry executive Sylvia Rhone at the City of Hope Gala 2019. This marked the first time all five members performed together. In late 2019, Robinson and Maxine Jones began touring under the group name The Funky Divas.

Artistry

Voice and vocal range 
Robinson's vocal range spans two octaves and five notes. She is a dynamic lyric soprano. As a member of En Vogue, Robinson was often credited for harmonizing the highest parts of their songs. Her lowest note was recorded on the song "Don't Let Go (Love)" wherein she sang an E3. Her highest note was recorded on "Part of Me" from their Born to Sing album, whereas she sang a C6 note in harmony. Robinson alternated first soprano with Cindy Herron in most of their harmonizing except on Born to Sing when Terry Ellis sang almost all of the higher notes in their harmony including "Hold On". Dawn was known as the singer with the rock voice in the group, with a raspy, smooth-as-glass sound. Although she is credited with pitch-perfect accuracy by the group members. However, her sound is noticeably missed after her departure and is distinguishably unique from the other three original singers given her commanding chest-range. She also sang lead vocals on their biggest hits including: "Whatta Man", "Don't Let Go (Love)", "Giving Him Something He Can Feel", and the lead verse vocals on their signature song "My Lovin' (You're Never Gonna Get It)".

Personal life 
Robinson has been married once and has no children. Robinson was married to Andre "Dre" Allen from May 24, 2003, until 2010. As of 2012, Robinson has been in a personal relationship with former international soccer player, U.K. fashion icon and BMG recording artist Christopher Nils Connolly. Robinson stated on her reality show R&B Divas LA that she was looking forward to starting a family with Connolly. During an interview with Fubar Radio in July 2017, Robinson stated that they were no longer together.

Discography

Studio albums
 Dawn (2002)

Collaboration albums
 Lucy Pearl (with Lucy Pearl) (2000)

Filmography

Films

Television

References

External links 
 
 
 

1966 births
1968 births
American dance musicians
American women pop singers
20th-century African-American women singers
American soul singers
African-American actresses
American television actresses
Atlantic Records artists
En Vogue members
Living people
Musicians from New London, Connecticut
American contemporary R&B singers
21st-century American women singers
Lucy Pearl members
21st-century American singers
21st-century African-American women singers